Ryan Ready (born November 7, 1978) is a Canadian former professional ice hockey left winger who played in the National Hockey League with the Philadelphia Flyers.

Playing career

Ready was drafted 100th overall in the 1997 NHL Entry Draft by the Calgary Flames. After playing his first seven NHL games with the Philadelphia Flyers in 2005–06, Ready signed with the Iserlohn Roosters of the DEL on September 15, 2006.

After four seasons with the Roosters,  He signed a one-year contract with EHC München on July 16, 2010. In the 2010–11 season, Ready posted 44 points in 43 games with München before succumbing to injury to again miss out on the playoffs. On February 27, 2011, Ready signed a one-year extension to remain in Munich. However prior to the start of the 2011-12 season on August 8, 2011, Ready remained in Canada and unexpectedly announced his retirement from professional hockey.

Career statistics

Regular season and playoffs

Awards
1998–99: First All-Star Team (OHL)
1998–99: Leo Lalonde Memorial Trophy Overage Player of the Year (OHL)
1998–99: Second All-Star Team (CHL)
2004–05: Calder Cup Philadelphia Phantoms

References

External links
 

1978 births
Belleville Bulls players
Calgary Flames draft picks
Canadian ice hockey left wingers
EHC München players
Sportspeople from Peterborough, Ontario
Iserlohn Roosters players
Kansas City Blades players
Living people
Manitoba Moose players
Philadelphia Flyers players
Philadelphia Phantoms players
Syracuse Crunch players
Worcester IceCats players
Ice hockey people from Ontario
Canadian expatriate ice hockey players in Germany